Kanauga is an unincorporated community and census-designated place (CDP) in Gallia County, Ohio, United States. As of the 2010 census it had a population of 175.

History
A post office called Kanauga was established in 1896, and remained in operation until it was discontinued in the 1960s. The origin of the name Kanauga is obscure.

Geography
Kanauga is located in eastern Gallia County, primarily in the northeast corner of Gallipolis Township, but extending north into the southeast corner of Addison Township. It is bordered to the south by the city of Gallipolis and to the east by the Ohio River, which forms the Ohio–West Virginia border. Directly across the river is the city of Point Pleasant, West Virginia, and the mouth of the Kanawha River.

U.S. Route 35 passes through the southern part of the Kanauga CDP, leading east across the Ohio on the Silver Memorial Bridge. US-35 leads southeast  to its terminus in Teays Valley, West Virginia, and northwest  to Chillicothe. Ohio Route 7 passes through the center of Kanauga, leading northeast  to Parkersburg, West Virginia, and southwest  to the center of Gallipolis.

Demographics

References

Census-designated places in Gallia County, Ohio
Census-designated places in Ohio